Adamsfield is a locality in Tasmania, Australia, where osmiridium was discovered in 1925.  Alluvial mining resulted in one of the world's largest sources of osmium and iridium metal.

Florentine Post Office opened on 1 November 1925. It was renamed "Adamsfield" next month and closed in 1960.

References

Localities in Tasmania
Ghost towns in Tasmania
South West Tasmania